Jindires (also spelled, Jandairis, Jandires, Jendires, Jendeires, or Jandarus; Kurdish: Cindirês or Cindirêsê) is a town in northern Syria in the Afrin District of the Aleppo Governorate. Nearby localities include Deir Ballut and Bayadah to the southwest, Zahra to the northwest, Kafr Safra to the north, Afrin to the northeast and Burj Abdullah to the east. According to the Syria Central Bureau of Statistics (CBS), Jindires had a population of 13,661 in the 2004 census. It was captured by the Turkish Military and its proxy, the "Syrian National Army" in March 2018. On 12 October 2022, Hayat Tahrir al-Sham took control of the town.

Name
Jindiris is the site of the ancient town of Gindarus or Gindaros also called Gindara. The Middle Persian and Parthian transliterations, attested in Shapur I's inscription at the Ka'ba-ye Zartosht, are Gndlswy and Gndrws respectively.

History
The ancient town was originally an acropolis of Cyrrhestica during the Hellenistic period. The Battle of Mount Gindarus took place near the town in 38 BC. The Parthians under Pacorus I suffered a massive defeat to the Roman armies of Ventidius and Pacorus himself was killed in battle. Under the Romans the city belonged to Antioch. In 252/3, during the second Roman campaign of Sasanian King Shapur I (240–270), the city was captured by the Persians. Emperor Theodosius I fortified the city during his reign (379–395). Traces of the fortified wall still remain on the south and west side of the tell, while the modern village is located at the base.

In the 14th century, during Mamluk rule, Jindires was visited by Syrian geographer al-Dimashqi who described it as "a town near Tizin, and in the territory of Jumah. It is a place full of habitations. There are thermal springs here, but it is unknown where the waters rise, or whither they flow."

The 19th-century British writer, William Harrison Ainsworth, visited the village and described it in his magazine as "containing about fifty cottages, and characterized by its artificial mound, or tel, upon which but few traces are now to be met of the castle or citadel (Acropolis in Greek; Arx in Latin) of Cyrrhestica, and described by Strabo as 'a fit receptacle for thieves.'"

Ecclesiastical history
The first and only known bishop of Gindarus was Peter, who attended the Council of Nicaea in 325 and that of Antioch in 341. At the time of Justinian, Gindarus had only a periodeutes and not a bishop. The relics of St. Marinus were kept here but were later transferred to Antioch. The bishopric is included in the Catholic Church's list of titular sees.

Modern era
In the summer of 2012, during the Syrian uprising, Jindires was taken over by  the People's Protection Units (YPG).

On 8 March 2018, Jindires was captured by the Syrian National Army from the YPG, during Operation Olive Branch. The town was heavily damaged in the earthquake of 6 February 2023, with hundreds of residents killed or injured.

References

Sources

 

Populated places in Afrin District
Towns in Aleppo Governorate
Kurdish communities in Syria
Gindarus